Bicyclus sciathis, the Sciathic bush brown, is a butterfly in the family Nymphalidae. It is found in Nigeria, Cameroon, Gabon, the Republic of the Congo and the central part of the Democratic Republic of the Congo. The habitat consists of lowland forests.

References

Elymniini
Butterflies described in 1866
Butterflies of Africa
Taxa named by William Chapman Hewitson